Walz is a surname of German origin. It that may refer to:

Carl E. Walz (born 1955), American astronaut
Christian Walz (born 1978), Swedish musician
Dale Walz (born 1964), American politician and police officer
Ernst Christian Walz (1802–1857), German archaeologist
Franz Walz (1885–1945), German fighter pilot
Gottlob Walz (1881–1943), German diver
Hanna Walz (1918–1997), German politician
Hans Walz (1883–1974), German merchant
Jeff Walz (born 1971), American basketball coach
Martha M. Walz (born 1961), American politician
Stefan Walz (born 1963), Swiss actor
Tim Walz (born 1964), American politician
Wes Walz (born 1970), Canadian ice hockey player and coach
Zach Walz (born 1976), American football player

See also
Waltz (surname)

German-language surnames